Live is a live album by the American country music singer Barbara Mandrell, released in August 1981.

This album spawned two hit singles, "I Was Country When Country Wasn't Cool" and "Wish You Were Here". "I Was Country When Country Wasn't Cool" became Mandrell's signature song, and a return to her roots, peaking at #1 on the Billboard Country Singles chart in 1981. The song features an uncredited appearance by George Jones. "Wish You Were Here" peaked at #2 on the Billboard country charts, and also appeared on the (Billboard) Adult Contemporary charts, reaching #40.  The album includes cover versions of popular songs, including "The Battle Hymn of the Republic" and the Hank Williams' hit "Hey Good Lookin'", and closes with a full-length vocal version of "Country Girl", the theme song to Mandrell's 1980-82 television show, Barbara Mandrell and the Mandrell Sisters.

This album was one of Mandrell's biggest-selling albums in the United States, receiving a "Gold" certification by the RIAA, after the album moved 500,000 copies. It is only one of two albums by Mandrell that received a certification by the RIAA in the United States. The album peaked at #4 on the Billboard Top Country Albums chart (her highest peak position on that chart), as well as #86 on the Billboard 200.

Track listing
"Intro... / Sleeping Single in a Double Bed"
"Unsung Heroes"
"She's Out There Dancing Alone"
"Doin' It Right"
"Years / Love Is Fair"
"Hey Good Lookin'"
"Wish You Were Here"
"Instrumental Medley: Mountain Dew / Fireball Mail / Old Joe Clark / Uncle Joe's Boogie"
"In My Heart"
"I Was Country When Country Wasn't Cool" (featuring George Jones)
"The Battle Hymn of the Republic"
"Country Girl"

Personnel

All tracks except 10
Charlie Bundy - bass guitar, background vocals
Mike Jones - steel guitar, mandolin
Barbara Mandrell - banjo, double-neck guitar, dobro, mandolin, steel guitar, saxophone, lead vocals
Gene Miller - acoustic guitar, electric guitar, background vocals
Gary Smith - piano, electric piano, synthesizer, background vocals
Lonnie Webb - synthesizer, background vocals
Randy Wright - drums, background vocals

Track 10
Mike Baird - drums
Anita Ball - background vocals
Lea Jane Berinati - background vocals
David Briggs - piano
Jimmy Capps - acoustic guitar
Sonny Garrish - steel guitar
Vicki Hampton - background vocals
George Jones - featured vocals
Barbara Mandrell - lead vocals
Charlie McCoy - harmonica, vibraphone
Farrell Morris - percussion
Fred Newell - electric guitar, banjo
Neil Stubenhaus - bass guitar
Fred Tackett - acoustic guitar
Marty Walsh - electric guitar

Charts

Weekly charts

Year-end charts

Singles

Certifications

References

Barbara Mandrell albums
1981 live albums
Albums produced by Tom Collins (record producer)
MCA Records live albums